is an area composed of two quarters of Hamburg, which are characterized by their largely preserved architecture.

The Hoheluftchaussee is the boundary between the two quarters.

With about 22,673 inhabitants per square kilometer (as of 2016), Hoheluft is one of the most densely populated quarters in all of Germany.

Geography
The Isebekkanal is the southeast border of Hoheluft. Behind it lies the quarter of Harvestehude. Hoheluft-Ost also borders Eppendorf, Hoheluft-West also borders Lokstedt in the north and Eimsbüttel in the west. The Hoheluftchaussee in the east forms the border between Hoheluft-West and the district of Hoheluft-Ost, part of the district of Hamburg-Nord.

History
Historically and administratively, the district of Hoheluft is closely connected with Eppendorf, which - like Eimsbüttel and Harvestehude - had been owned by Harvestehude Monastery. The name Hoheluft was only officially introduced as a district name in 1939.

The origin of the name is not clearly known. The local historians Wilhelm Melhop and Armin Clausen assume that the boundary point Veerendeel to the former village of Lokstedt as the elevation of the area over the lowlands of the Isebek was designated as "on the Hohenluft". But it can also be that the name is derived from a gallows erected in 1602 or the "Hoge Licht" of the local inn. This light served the purpose of guiding drivers at night and fog. The first mentions of the name Hoheluft in documents are in 1802, when it is mentioned in the church book of Eppendorf, and in 1805, where it is mentioned in logs of the Johanniskloster, which describe a plot "auf der hohe Lucht."

Politics
These are the results of the Hamburg state election:

References 

Quarters of Hamburg
Hamburg-Nord